Joseph Jolinon (1885-1971) was a French writer. He was born in La Clayette and studied law in Lille. He was mobilized in 1914, and served as a soldier throughout the First World War. Afterwards, he took up the law profession and settled in Lyon. He became a professional writer in the 1920s. The author of more than two dozen books, he won the Grand prix du roman awarded by the Académie française in 1950 for his novel cycle Les Provinciaux.

References 

1885 births
1971 deaths
People from Saône-et-Loire
20th-century French non-fiction writers
Grand Prix du roman de l'Académie française winners
French male writers
20th-century French male writers